Astrothelium quatuorseptatum is a species of corticolous (bark-dwelling) lichen in the family Trypetheliaceae. Found in Brazil, it was formally described as a new species in 2016 by André Aptroot and Marcela Cáceres. The ascomata are pear-shaped (pyriform) and typically occur in groups of two to five, usually immersed in the bark tissue. The lichen does not react with any of the standard chemical spot tests, and thin-layer chromatography did not reveal the presence of any lichen products. The species epithet quatuorseptatum refers to the ascospores, which usually have four septa that divide the spore into distinct compartments. A. octosporum is quite similar in appearance, but that species has twice the number of septa in its spores, and it contains lichexanthone.

References

quatuorseptatum
Lichen species
Lichens described in 2016
Taxa named by André Aptroot
Taxa named by Marcela Cáceres
Lichens of North Brazil